Dineva Rumiana Naydenova (12 December 1965 - 30 July 1999), was a Bulgarian pop-folk and folk singer.

Life 
She became famous with the songs "Two Eyes Cry", "Bells Ring", "Only With You", "Without You", "Hammer, Hammer" and others. She graduated from the Kotel School of Music with a first specialization in kaval and a second specialization in singing. She also played the piano, and worked as a music teacher in Antonovo. She had two children - Ilian and Mariana. Rumyana died in a serious car accident near the village of Blatets in Sliven. In 2002, a monument of the singer was built in her hometown, in her memory.

Career 
She began her singing career as a soloist with the Strandzha Orchestra. Her first album was released in 1991 and was titled "Songs from Strandzha". In 1994, on the album "I love to live", she recorded the ballad "Two eyes cry", which became a successful brand of the singer. The music and lyrics of the song were recorded at the same time, at a time when she was having a hard time separating from her husband Rusi Androlov. For these two albums, the singer worked with the company Sliven. Her true success began when she signed a contract with Milena Records, with which she released the albums "Prayer for Love" (1996), "Only with You" (1997), "I Love to Live" (1997), "Eternal Love" (1998), "You Dance" (1999) and "Day After Day" (1999). The singer's discography contains 8 solo albums, the last one was released posthumously.

Death 
Rumyana died in a car accident, in the village of Blatets, Bulgaria, and her children were seriously injured and then healed a few days after their mother's death.

Discography

Albums 
  Strandzha Songs  (1991)
 I like to live (1994)
 Prayer for Love (1996)
  Only with You  (1997)
 I like to live (1997)
  Eternal Love  (1998)
  You're Good  (1999)
  Day after day  (1999)

Filmography 
 Rumyana - Film (2000)

Bibliography 
  Rumyana - I like to live  (2020)

Awards 
 1998 - Audience Award - Hit Cocktail
 1998 - Video of the Year "Come Back, Big" - New Folk Magazine Annual Awards
 1998 - Eternal Love Album of the Year - New Folk Magazine Annual Awards
 1999 - Outstanding Achievements - New Folk Magazine Annual Awards

References

External links 
 Site Web Official
 Rumyana at Instagram
 Rumyana at Discogs
 21 години след трагедията: Споменът за певицата Румяна остава вечен, 30 iulie 2020 

1965 births
1999 deaths
Bulgarian singers
20th-century Bulgarian singers
Road incident deaths in Bulgaria